The Delaware Valley Legacy Fund (DVLF) is a community foundation whose mission is to support the needs of the lesbian, gay, bisexual, and transgender (LGBT) and straight-allied communities in Eastern Pennsylvania, Delaware, and New Jersey. It is engaged in building a permanent endowment and philanthropic apparatus to serve the fundraising and grant making. DVLF was founded in 1993 and is based in Center City Philadelphia.

History
DVLF was created in 1993, when community activists and donors decided that there was a need, given the growth of the LGBT movement, for a permanent reservoir of funds to support organizations in Greater Philadelphia. Many of these leaders had lived through the McCarthy Era, the Civil Rights Movement, and the beginning of the HIV/AIDS era, and desired the stability that could be provided by a permanent funding source. Legendary lesbian activist Barbara Gittings, whose activism began forty years earlier in the 1950s, served as a founding board member that also included Larry Biddle and Dennis Green.

In 2008, DVLF grants will total over $55,000, up from $18,800 in 2007.

The current president is D. Mark Mitchell and the current executive director is Samantha M. Giusti.

It has a 12-member Board of Directors and an Advisory Council of about 25 members.

Fundraising
DVLF devotes significant resources to raising funds for programs and growing the endowment. It cultivates a broad donor base of individuals, couples, and businesses interested in supporting regional LGBT communities.

Grant making
DVLF is also a grantmaking organization. In 2008, DVLF grants exceeded $50,000. Organizations that have received funding that year included:
 ActionAIDS
 AIDS Delaware – “You’re Not Alone” Youth Program
 AIDS Services in Asian Communities*
 Astraea Lesbian Foundation for Justice
 Attic Youth Center*
 Beta Phi Omega Sorority
 Bethel Community Center*
 Bucks Co. Council on Alcohol & Drug Dependence
 CAMP Rehoboth
 Delaware Valley Grantmakers
 Diakon Family Services
 Dignity Philadelphia
 Equality Action Pennsylvania*
 Equality Advocates Pennsylvania*
 Equality Forum
 Free Library of Philadelphia Foundation, Barbara Gittings Collection*
 Foyer of Philadelphia*
 Funders for Lesbian & Gay Issues
 House of  Manolo Blahnik
 Human Rights Campaign – Philadelphia
 Human Rights Campaign Foundation
 Independence Business Alliance
 Lambda Legal Defense & Education Fund
 Martin Luther King High School Rainbow Room
 Men of All Colors Together – Philadelphia
 Mountain Meadow*
 Mural Arts Program
 National AIDS Fund
 National Black Justice Coalition
 New Hope Celebrates
 NLGJA Scholarship — Indiana University
 Philadelphia Falcons Soccer Club
 Philadelphia Gay Tourism Caucu
 Philly Pride Presents, Inc.
 Philadelphia Theatre Workshop
 Philadelphia Voices of Pride
 Philly Black Gay Pride COLOURS
 Rainbow Room — Planned Parenthood of Bucks County
 Queer Philadelphia Asians*
 Sean Halpin Memorial Scholarship at The Philadelphia Foundation
 SeniorLAW Center
 Smoke, Lilies, and Jade Project
 University of the Arts — Justin Eng Scholarship Award
 The William Way Community Center
(Asterisks indicate organizations for which DVLF provided the founding grant or grants.)

References

External links
 DVLF website
 Philadelphia Foundation

LGBT culture in Philadelphia
LGBT in Delaware
LGBT organizations in the United States
LGBT political advocacy groups in Delaware
LGBT political advocacy groups in New Jersey
LGBT political advocacy groups in Pennsylvania
Organizations based in Philadelphia
1993 establishments in Pennsylvania